The maroon oriole (Oriolus traillii) is a species of bird in the family Oriolidae. It is found in Southeast Asia.

Taxonomy
The maroon oriole was originally described in the genus Pastor. Along with the black, black-and-crimson and silver orioles, it belongs to a clade of red and black orioles.

Four subspecies are recognized: 
 O. t. traillii – (Vigors, 1832) occurs from the Himalayas to southern China, northern Indochina and northern Thailand
 O. t. ardens – (R. Swinhoe, 1862)occurs on Taiwan
 O. t. nigellicauda – (Swinhoe, 1870) occurs on Hainan
 O. t. robinsoni – Delacour, 1927 occurs in southern Indochina

Description

The maroon oriole has maroon and black plumage with a black head, neck and wings with a blueish beak. The females have slightly darker bodies and the juveniles have lighter bodies. The adult male is glossy crimson-maroon in color, with black head, neck and wings and a chestnut-maroon tail. The females and immature males have a greyish-white underpart with black streaks.  Colouration varies somewhat across the range, with those in the Indian Subcontinent having duller colours and those in Southeast Asia having brighter colours, also tending to somewhat reddish tones.

Distribution and habitat
The maroon oriole is found in Bangladesh, Bhutan, Cambodia, India, Laos, Myanmar, Nepal, Taiwan, Thailand, Tibet, and Vietnam. In India, it is found from Himachal Pradesh east to Arunachal Pradesh and the hills of Manipur.

Its natural habitat is subtropical or tropical moist lowland forests.

Behavior and ecology
The maroon oriole lives alone or in pairs. The nesting season is from April to May. The nest is a deep massive cup of bast fibre that is bound with cobwebs. Both male and female birds share the parental duties.

Diet and feeding
The maroon oriole eats wild figs, berries, insects and nectar.

References

maroon oriole
maroon oriole
Birds of North India
Birds of Nepal
Birds of Eastern Himalaya
Birds of Yunnan
Birds of Hainan
Birds of Taiwan
Birds of Southeast Asia
maroon oriole
Taxonomy articles created by Polbot
Birds of Myanmar